Joseph Gaspard Boucher (February 3, 1897 – April 18, 1955) was a journalist and political figure in New Brunswick, Canada. He represented Madawaska County in the Legislative Assembly of New Brunswick from 1935 to 1952 and Restigouche—Madawaska in the House of Commons of Canada as a Liberal member from 1953 to 1955.

Known as Gaspard, he was born in Notre-Dame-du-Portage, Quebec and studied at the agricultural college at Sainte-Anne-de-La-Pocatière and McDonald College (now the Macdonald Campus of McGill University) at Sainte-Anne-de-Bellevue. He worked as an agronomist for some time before moving to Edmundston, New Brunswick in 1920 where he became manager of the Royal Hotel acquired by his father.

Gaspard Boucher married Annette Lamarche in 1921. The couple had nine children.

Gaspard Boucher was involved with the Société nationale des Acadiens and was one of the founders of the New Brunswick chapter of the Ordre de Jacques Cartier, an organization dedicated to defending the rights of Francophones. Gaspard aided in the establishment of credit unions in the Madawaska region and the Knights of Columbus branch in the city of Edmundston.

In 1923, Boucher became owner-editor of Le Madawaska newspaper. Boucher served in the province's Executive Council as a minister without portfolio from 1941 to 1949 and as Provincial Secretary-Treasurer from August 10, 1949 to October 8, 1952.

Gaspard Boucher died of a heart attack at the age of 58.

References 
 
 Fonds J-Gaspard Boucher, University of Moncton Archives (French)
 Village Historique Acadien article on Gaspard Boucher
SAVOIE, Alexandre J. «Biographie de J. Gaspard Boucher», Revue de la Société historique du Madawaska, Vol. XII, Nos. 1-2, Janvier-juin 1984, 72 pages.

1897 births
1955 deaths
French Quebecers
20th-century Canadian legislators
20th-century Canadian newspaper publishers (people)
Canadian newspaper publishers (people)
Canadian agronomists
Members of the Executive Council of New Brunswick
Members of the House of Commons of Canada from New Brunswick
Liberal Party of Canada MPs
People from Edmundston
People from Bas-Saint-Laurent
Canadian Roman Catholics
New Brunswick Liberal Association MLAs
Finance ministers of New Brunswick
20th-century agronomists